Dhemaji Assembly constituency is one of the 126 assembly constituencies of  Assam a north east state of India. Dhemaji is also part of Lakhimpur Lok Sabha constituency. It is a reserved seat for the Scheduled tribes (ST).

Dhemaji Assembly constituency

Following are details on Dhemaji Assembly constituency-

Country: India.
 State: Assam.
 District: Dhemaji district .
 Lok Sabha Constituency: Lakhimpur Lok Sabha/Parliamentary constituency.
 Assembly Categorisation: Rural constituency.
 Literacy Level:69.07%.
 Eligible Electors as per 2021 General Elections: 2,11,237 Eligible Electors. Male Electors:1,08,573. Female Electors:1,02,664.
 Geographic Co-Ordinates:  27°27’31.0"N 94°23’25.1"E.
 Total Area Covered:  1147 square kilometres.
 Area Includes: : Dhakuakhana thana (excluding Gohain and Dhakuakhana mouzas) and Dhemaji mouza in Dhemaji thana in Dhemaji sub-division, of Dhemaji district of Assam.
 Inter State Border :Dhemaji.
 Number Of Polling Stations: Year 2011-273,Year 2016-273,Year 2021-113.

Members of Legislative Assembly

Following is the list of past members representing Dhemaji Assembly constituency in Assam Legislature-

 1967: Romesh Mohon Kuli, Swatantra Party.
 1972: Romesh Mohon Kuli, Swatantra Party.
 1978: Purna Chandra Bora, Independent.
 1983: Durgeswar Patir, Indian National Congress.
 1985: Dilip Kumar Saikia, Independent.
 1991: Dilip Kumar Saikia, Asom Gana Parishad.
 1996: Dilip Kumar Saikia, Asom Gana Parishad.
 2000: Dilip Kumar Saikia, Asom Gana Parishad.
 2001: Dilip Kumar Saikia, Asom Gana Parishad.
 2006: Sumitra Patir, Indian National Congress.
 2011: Sumitra Patir, Indian National Congress.
 2016: Pradan Baruah, Bharatiya Janata Party.
 2017: Dr. Ranoj Pegu, Bharatiya Janata Party.

Election results

2017 by-election

A by-election was held in 2017 to fill the vacancy created by Pradan Baruah's election as MP for Lakhimpur

2016 results

2011 result

See also

 Dhemaji
 List of constituencies of Assam Legislative Assembly

References

External links 
 

Assembly constituencies of Assam
Dhemaji
Dhemaji district